Leptocroca amenena is a moth of the family Oecophoridae first described by Edward Meyrick in 1888. It is endemic to New Zealand. The classification of this moth within the genus Leptocroca is regarded as unsatisfactory and in need of revision. As such this species is currently also known as Leptocroca (s.l.) amenena.

References

Moths described in 1888
Oecophoridae
Taxa named by Edward Meyrick
Moths of New Zealand
Endemic fauna of New Zealand
Endemic moths of New Zealand